In eight-dimensional geometry, a truncated 8-cube is a convex uniform 8-polytope, being a truncation of the regular 8-cube.

There are unique 7 degrees of truncation for the 8-cube. Vertices of the truncation 8-cube are located as pairs on the edge of the 8-cube. Vertices of the bitruncated 8-cube are located on the square faces of the 8-cube. Vertices of the tritruncated 7-cube are located inside the cubic cells of the 8-cube. The final truncations are best expressed relative to the 8-orthoplex.

Truncated 8-cube

Alternate names 
 Truncated octeract (acronym tocto) (Jonathan Bowers)

Coordinates 
Cartesian coordinates for the vertices of a truncated 8-cube, centered at the origin, are all 224 vertices are sign (4) and coordinate (56) permutations of
 (±2,±2,±2,±2,±2,±2,±1,0)

Images

Related polytopes 
The truncated 8-cube, is seventh in a sequence of truncated hypercubes:

Bitruncated 8-cube

Alternate names 
 Bitruncated octeract (acronym bato) (Jonathan Bowers)

Coordinates 
Cartesian coordinates for the vertices of a truncated 8-cube, centered at the origin, are all the sign coordinate permutations of
 (±2,±2,±2,±2,±2,±1,0,0)

Images

Related polytopes 
The bitruncated 8-cube is sixth in a sequence of bitruncated hypercubes:

Tritruncated 8-cube

Alternate names 
 Tritruncated octeract (acronym tato) (Jonathan Bowers)

Coordinates 
Cartesian coordinates for the vertices of a truncated 8-cube, centered at the origin, are all the sign coordinate permutations of
 (±2,±2,±2,±2,±1,0,0,0)

Images

Quadritruncated 8-cube

Alternate names 
 Quadritruncated octeract (acronym oke) (Jonathan Bowers)

Coordinates 
Cartesian coordinates for the vertices of a bitruncated 8-orthoplex, centered at the origin, are all sign and coordinate permutations of
 (±2,±2,±2,±2,±1,0,0,0)

Images

Related polytopes

Notes

References
 H.S.M. Coxeter: 
 H.S.M. Coxeter, Regular Polytopes, 3rd Edition, Dover New York, 1973 
 Kaleidoscopes: Selected Writings of H.S.M. Coxeter, edited by F. Arthur Sherk, Peter McMullen, Anthony C. Thompson, Asia Ivic Weiss, Wiley-Interscience Publication, 1995,  
 (Paper 22) H.S.M. Coxeter, Regular and Semi Regular Polytopes I, [Math. Zeit. 46 (1940) 380–407, MR 2,10]
 (Paper 23) H.S.M. Coxeter, Regular and Semi-Regular Polytopes II, [Math. Zeit. 188 (1985) 559–591]
 (Paper 24) H.S.M. Coxeter, Regular and Semi-Regular Polytopes III, [Math. Zeit. 200 (1988) 3–45]
 Norman Johnson Uniform Polytopes, Manuscript (1991)
 N.W. Johnson: The Theory of Uniform Polytopes and Honeycombs, Ph.D. 
  o3o3o3o3o3o3x4x – tocto, o3o3o3o3o3x3x4o – bato, o3o3o3o3x3x3o4o – tato, o3o3o3x3x3o3o4o – oke

External links 
 Polytopes of Various Dimensions
 Multi-dimensional Glossary

8-polytopes